Evelyn Anselevicius (née Hill; 1923–2003) was an American textile artist best known for her large-scale, geometric woven tapestries, often created using Mexican techniques and traditions.

Early life and education 
Evelyn Anselevicius was born in Hobart, Oklahoma as Evelyn Jane Hill. She grew up in the Texas Panhandle.

In 1947, she attended Black Mountain College in Western North Carolina, studying under former Bauhaus design professor Josef Albers.

Afterwards she attended the Institute of Design in Chicago, where she met her husband, the architect George Anselevicius, whom she married in May 1954. Her training as a weaver also included an apprenticeship under Majel (Midge) Chance Obata.

Career 
Evelyn Anselevicius worked for Knoll Textiles in the 1950s. A handweaving studio was set up there under Anselevicius' direction, broadening the scope of designs that Knoll could translate into machine-loomed fabrics.

As an independent weaver, her work focused on large-scale, monumental tapestries with geometric designs and patterns, and bold use of color. She often made use of wool spun and dyed in Mexico, Mexican rug techniques, and the inclusion of beaded objects.  For several years she worked out of a studio in San Miguel de Allende, Mexico, where she employed local weavers. She later moved her studio to Albuquerque.

Exhibitions and collections 
Some of the designs Anselevicius produced for Knoll during the 1950s (as Evelyn Hill) were included in the 1952 exhibition Good Design at the Museum of Modern Art in New York City. Her independent work was included in the exhibition Wall Hangings at the Museum of Modern Art in 1969 and twice at the  International Bienniale of Tapestry at Lausanne, Switzerland. In 1971, Anselevicius' works were shown at the newly opened Ruth Kaufmann Gallery located in New York City.

Her work is held in collections worldwide, including the Black Mountain College Museum + Arts Center, the Cooper Hewitt Design Museum, the Museum of Arts and Design, the Museum of Modern Art, the Philadelphia Museum of Art, and the Rodin Museum.

References 

20th-century American women artists
People from Hobart, Oklahoma
Black Mountain College alumni
Artists from Oklahoma
Artists from Texas
Illinois Institute of Technology alumni
People from San Miguel de Allende
American weavers
Tapestry artists
Artists from Albuquerque, New Mexico
American expatriates in Mexico
1923 births
2003 deaths
21st-century American women
Textile designers